Thomas Jenkins may refer to:

Thomas Jenkins (bishop) (1871–1955), missionary bishop of the Episcopal Church
Thomas Jenkins (footballer) (1877–?), Rhyl F.C. and Wales international footballer
Thomas Jenkins (headmaster), Shakespeare's headmaster
Thomas Jenkins (Medal of Honor) (1831–?), American sailor and Medal of Honor recipient in the American Civil War
Thomas Jenkins (rugby league), Australian rugby league player
Thomas Jenkins (Wisconsin politician, born 1801) (1801–1866), member of the Legislature of the Wisconsin Territory and of the Wisconsin State Assembly
Thomas Jenkins (Wisconsin politician, born 1832) (1832–1911), two-term member of the Wisconsin State Assembly
Thomas A. Jenkins (1880–1959), U.S. congressman from Ohio
Thomas Lowten Jenkins (1812–1867), English rower and barrister

See also
Bert Jenkins or Thomas Bertie Jenkins (1885–1943), Welsh rugby union and rugby league footballer
Edward Jenkins (priest) or Thomas Edward Jenkins (1902–1996), Anglican priest
Tom Jenkins (disambiguation)
Tommy Jenkins (born 1947), English footballer
Tommy Jenkins (Australian footballer) (1902–1979), Australian rules footballer
Jenkins (name)